Amphimallon spartanum is a species of beetle in the Melolonthinae subfamily that is endemic to Greece.

References

Beetles described in 1884
spartanum
Endemic fauna of Greece
Beetles of Europe